Ho Chi Minh City University of Transport, abbreviation: UT-HCMC is a public university under the Ministry of Transport in Vietnam. The university provides associate, undergraduate and postgraduate education in various areas of transport. The main campus is located in Binh Thanh District, Ho Chi Minh City. The predecessor of the university was the Ho Chi Minh City branch of Vietnam Maritime University, founded in 1988. From this branch, it was upgraded to university status in 2001.

Programs

Postgraduate
Undergraduate
Short courses

Faculties
Marine Navigation
Ship Machine
Electronic and Electrical Engineering and Telecommunication
Ship Engineering
Transportation Engineering
Construction Engineering
Mechanical Engineering
Information technology
Maritime Business Administration
Basic Sciences
Naval Architect and offshore construction

Campuses
Campus 1: No 2, Street D3, Ward 25, Binh Thanh District, HCMC
Campus 2: No 17, Tran Nao Street, Ward Binh An, District 2, HCMC
Campus 3: Street To Ky, Ward Tan Chanh Hiep, District 12, HCMC
Campus 4: No 5/1, Nguyen Thai Hoc Street, Ward 7, Vung Tau City

External links
 Official website

Government of Vietnam
Universities in Ho Chi Minh City